2 Heartless is the thirteenth mixtape by American rapper Moneybagg Yo. It was released on February 14, 2018, by Collective Music Group, Bread Gang Entertainment, N-Less Entertainment and Interscope Records, serving as his second commercial release with Interscope although Interscope refers the mixtape an album after the streaming success. The mixtape features guest appearances from Yo Gotti, Lil Baby, BlocBoy JB, and Quavo. The production lists Southside, Tay Keith, DJ Swift, Dmactoobangin, Track Gordy, Javar Rockmore and Fuse, among others.

This mixtape serves as the sequel to Heartless.

Background
On February 11, 2018, Moneybagg Yo unveiled the mixtape's tracklist and release date via Instagram.

Promotion

Tour
On March 6, 2018, Moneybagg Yo announced an official headlining concert tour to further promote the album titled 2 Heartless Tour. The tour began on April 7 in Rochester, at Main Street Armory.

Critical reception

Jackson Howard of Pitchfork stated that "A revelation hidden in plain sight, this Memphis rapper’s latest project is more proof that he’s headed for bigger things", criticising the album's lyricism: "He's so brazenly secure in his sound, so convinced of his impending success, that you're left feeling like you have to win him over, and not the other way around."

Track listing
Credits adapted from Tidal.

Personnel
Credits adapted from Tidal.

Performers
 Moneybagg Yo – primary artist
 Quavo – featured artist 
 Yo Gotti – featured artist 
 BlocBoy JB – featured artist 
 Lil Baby – featured artist 

Technical
 Skywalker OG – record engineering , mixing engineering 
 Leo Goff – mixing 
 Tony Wilson – mastering 

Production
 Southside – producer 
 Dmactoobangin – producer 
 Fuse – producer 
 Stonii Romo – producer 
 DJ Swift – producer 
 Track Gordy – producer 
 Javar Rockamore – producer 
 Tay Keith – producer 
 Zaytoven – producer 
 Ben Billions – producer

Charts

References

2018 mixtape albums
Albums produced by Southside (record producer)
Albums produced by Tay Keith
Albums produced by Zaytoven
Moneybagg Yo albums
Sequel albums